Volta Grande is a Brazilian municipality in the state of Minas Gerais. As of 2020 its population was estimated to be 5,261.

Geography
Volta Grande is located in the Zona da Mata mesoregion of Minas Gerais near the border with the state of Rio de Janeiro.

Climate

Hydrography
The rivers Paraiba do Sul and Angu drain the municipality of Volta Grande which is part of the Paraiba do Sul river basin.

History
The town originated from a village formed in 1835 and was elevated to a district of the municipality of Alem Paraíba in 1891. Emancipation came in 1938.

It is the birthplace of film director Humberto Mauro.

References

Municipalities in Minas Gerais